FACTS or F.A.C.T.S. (Fantasy Animation Comics Toys Sciencefiction) is a Belgian speculative fiction convention.

Launched in 1993 in Ghent, it has grown over the years and now welcomes over 30,000 visitors at each edition. From 1998 until 2008 the F.A.C.T.S. convention was held in the I.C.C. in Ghent, Belgium. The 2009 edition took place in Flanders Expo for the first time and has been expending there ever since. The convention currently covers more than 24,000 sq. m.. FACTS has been created by Emmanuel Van Melkebeke and 3 of his friends.

External links
 Official FACTS website
 Flanders Expo
 Review of FACTS 2004 @ Rebelscum

Comics conventions
Multigenre conventions
Recurring events established in 1993